Podlaskie Voivodeship or Podlasie Province is a voivodeship (province) in northeastern Poland. The name of the province and its territory correspond to the historic region of Podlachia. The capital and largest city is Białystok.

It borders on Masovian Voivodeship to the west, Warmian-Masurian Voivodeship to the northwest, Lublin Voivodeship to the south, the Belarusian oblasts of Grodno and Brest to the east, the Lithuanian Counties of Alytus and Marijampolė to the northeast, and the Kaliningrad Oblast of Russia to the north.

The province was created on 1 January 1999, pursuant to the Polish local government reforms adopted in 1998, from the former Białystok and Łomża Voivodeships and the eastern half of the former Suwałki Voivodeship.

Etymology
The voivodeship takes its name from the historic region of Poland called Podlasie, or in Latin known as Podlachia.

There are two opinions regarding the origin of the region's name. People often derive it from the Proto-Slavic les or las, meaning "forest", i.e., it is an area "by the wood(s)" or an "area of forests", which would bring Podlasie close in meaning to adjacent Polesia. This theory has been questioned, as it does not properly take into consideration the vowel shifts "a" > "e" > "i" in various Slavic languages (in fact, it mixes vowels from different languages). Heavily wooded Podlasie is home to the primeval Białowieża Forest and National Park, the habitat of the European wisent bison and tarpan.

A second view holds that the term comes from the expression pod Lachem, i.e., "under the Poles" (see: Lechia). Some claim it to mean "under Polish rule", which does not seem historically sound, as the area belonged to the Grand Duchy of Lithuania until 1569, and the southern part of it—until 1795.

A better variant of the latter theory holds that the name originates from the period when the territory was within the Trakai Voivodeship of the Grand Duchy of Lithuania, along the border with Mazovia Province, primarily a fief of the Poland of the Piasts, and later part of the Kingdom of Poland of the Jagiellons. Hence pod Lachem would mean "near the Poles", "along the border with Poland". The Lithuanian name of the region, Palenkė, has exactly this meaning.

History

The voivodeship was created on January 1, 1999, out of the former Białystok and Łomża Voivodeships and the eastern half of the former Suwałki Voivodeship, pursuant to the Polish local government reforms adopted in 1998.

Geography
It has a varied landscape, shaped in the north by Baltic glaciation, the rest by Middle Poland glaciation. The highest peaks are in the north (Rowelska Top - 298 m), where the landscape is dominated by a hilly lake district. Lakeland: Zachodniosuwalskie, Wschodniosuwalskie, Ełckie) and Sandrowy lake district (Augustów Plain) in the central and southern pre-glacial plains prevail (plateaus: Kolneńska, Białystok, Wysokomazowiecka, Drohiczynska, Sokólskie Hills, Międzyrzecko łomżyński, Plain Bielsko), varied in topography with small basins and river valleys. Kurpie lies on the west edge of the outwash plains. Sand, gravel, clay, moraine, and in the valleys and basins of the rivers silt, sand and river peat predominate on the surface.

Environment

The vast forests (Białowieża, Augustów, Knyszyń, Kurpiowska), some of which are the only ones in Europe to have retained their original character, contain a unique wealth of flora and fauna. The vegetation of the region is extremely diverse, which contributes to the richness of the animal world. Visitors can also see moose, wolves, lynx and bison living in the Białowieża Forest and Knyszyń Forest.

Podlaskie has the lowest population density of the sixteen Polish voivodeships, and its largely unspoiled nature is one of its chief assets. Around 30% of the area of the voivodeship is under legal protection. The Polish part of the Białowieża Forest biosphere reserve (also a World Heritage Site) is in Podlaskie. There are four National Parks (Białowieża, Biebrza, Narew and Wigry), three Landscape Parks (Knyszyń Forest, Łomża and Suwałki), 88 nature reserves, and 15 protected landscape areas. The voivodeship constitutes a part of the ecologically clean area known as "the Green Lungs of Poland".

Climate
Podlaskie has a Warm Summer Continental or Hemiboreal climate (Dfb) according to the Köppen climate classification system, which is characterized by warm temperatures during summer and long and frosty winters. It is substantially different from most of the other Polish lowlands. The region is one of the coldest in Poland, with the average temperature in January being . The number of frost days ranges from 50 to 60, with frost from 110 to 138 days and the duration of snow cover from 90 to 110 days.

Podlaskie is the coldest region of Poland, located in the very northeast of the country near the border with Belarus and Lithuania. The region has a continental climate which is characterized by high temperatures during summer and long and frosty winters. The climate is affected by the cold fronts which come from Scandinavia and Siberia. The average temperature in the winter ranges from -15 °C (5 °F) to -4 °C (24.8 °F).

One of the cities located in Podlaskie - Suwalki - is called as The Polish North Pole, due to it is coldest temperature average around Poland.

Subdivisions and Białystok Metropolitan Region

Podlaskie Voivodeship is divided into 17 counties (powiats): 3 city counties and 14 land counties. These are further divided into 118 gminas.

Metropolitan Białystok was designated by the Voivodeship in the Regulation No. 52/05 of 16 May 2005  in order to help economically develop the region. In 2006, the metropolitan area's population was 450,254 inhabitants. It covers an area of 1.521 km ². For one km2, there are about 265 people. Among urban residents there are more women - 192 thousand. For every 100 men, there are 108 women on average. The municipalities adjacent to Białystok are slowly losing their agricultural character, becoming residential suburban neighborhoods.

Demographics

Podlaskie is the land of the confluence of cultures – Polish, Belarusian, Ukrainian, Lithuanian, Jewish and Tatar – and is indicative of the ethnic territories limits. Eastward of Podlaskie lie historic Polish lands, which are now part of Ukraine and Belarus and Lithuania. Today, mainly Polish and Ruthenian (Ukrainian and Belarusian) are spoken in Podlaskie, while Lithuanian is preserved by the small but compact Lithuanian minority concentrated in the Sejny County.

At the end of 2009 in Podlaskie Voivodeship there were 1,189,700 inhabitants, 3.1 percent of the total population of Poland. The average density of the population, the number of the population per 1 km2, was 59. The urban population in the same period was 60.2 percent of the total number of inhabitants of the voivodeship, where the percentage of females in the total population amounted to 51.3 percent. A statistical inhabitant of Podlasie was 37.7 years old, whereas in 2008 – 37.5 years old. The latest population projection predicts a consistent decrease in the population in Podlaskie Voivodeship. In the next 26 years, it will decrease by 117 thousand persons due to the ageing population.

Population according to 2002 census:
 Poles - 1,135,347
 Belarusians - 48,000

Economy 
The Gross domestic product (GDP) of the province was around 11 billion euros in 2018, accounting for 2.2% of Polish economic output. GDP per capita adjusted for purchasing power was €15,200 or 50% of the EU average in the same year. The GDP per employee was 57% of the EU average. Podlaskie Voivodeship is the province with the 5th lowest GDP per capita in Poland.

The following are general economic indicators for Podlaskie Voivodeship:
 Population (as of 30 September 2009) - 1,190,735
 Average paid employment in enterprise sector (November 2009) - 95896
 Average monthly gross wages and salaries in enterprise sector (November 2009) - 2,813.05 zł
 Unemployment rate (as of the end of November 2009) - 12,0%
 Dwellings completed in November 2009 - 661
 Procurement of milk (November 2009) - 126.8 mln l
 National economy entities from the REGON register, excluding persons tending private farms (as of the end of November 2009) - 89,654

According to the REGON register in the year 2002 there were around 95 thousand companies registered in the Podlaskie region (97% of them in the private sector), dealing with;
 Trade and servicing – 33.2%
 Providing services to real estates and companies – 11.8%
 Construction – 10.5%
 Industrial processing – 9.7%
 Transport 8.3%
 Agriculture, hunting and forestry 4.5%

Agriculture
Arable land constitutes around 60% of the total area of the region – most of which is ploughland (around 40%), forests, meadows and pastures. Over 120 000 farms are registered, roughly half of which are small farms of 1–5 ha and medium-sized farms of 5–10 ha. The smaller farms prefer intensive production (gardening, orcharding), whereas the larger ones engage in cattle and crop production. The cattle-raising farms are mainly oriented towards milk production.

n June 2015, the total area of ​​land in agricultural holdings in the Podlaskie Voivodeship amounted to 1,243.3 thousand hectares. ha. Agricultural land occupied 1058.3 thousand. ha, forests and forest land - 134.7 thous. ha, while the remaining land - 50.4 thous. ha. The average area of ​​agricultural land in a farm was 10.35 ha. Agriculture in Podlaskie Voivodeship is characterized by a high share of agricultural land in good agricultural condition (99.3%) - these include arable land, permanent crops, home gardens, permanent meadows and permanent pastures. 98.9 percent from all land in agricultural holdings, i.e. 1,254.3 thous. ha, belongs to individual farms. Podlaskie Voivodeship has the highest percentage of grassland among all voivodships of the country (almost 20% of the area). This is used to develop dairy and beef cattle farming. Podlaskie has the largest cattle stock in Poland (the average herd size in 2016 is 37.9). In terms of milk producing, the voivodeship, together with the Masovian Voivodeship, ranks first in the country. Podlaskie Voivodeship receive about 20% of the total production in the country. Cereals is an important crops grown in the region and themainly: wheat, rye, barley, oat, triticale, cereal mixtures, grain maize, millet, buckwheat. Other crops grown by farmers include, among others, potatoes, oil seeds, forage plants (green fodder, carrots, beets, turnips or alfalfa).

The natural conditions of the region are conducive to the development of organic growing, which at present is practised by around 100 farms. Over 600 farms in the region offer agritourist services.

Transportation

Culture 
Podlaskie is the most diverse of all Polish voivodships.
The area has been inhabited for centuries by members of different nations and religions: Poles, Jews, Belarusians, Lithuanians, Ukrainians, Rusyns, Romani, Lipka Tatars and Filippians.

Many places of religious worship remain:
 An 18th-century former Carmelite monastery on Wigry Lake
 A former Jesuit complex in Drohiczyn
 Christ's Transfiguration Orthodox church on the Holy Mount of Grabarka
 Saint Nicolaus the Miracle Worker Orthodox church in Białystok
 A 17th-century synagogue in Tykocin
 The oldest Polish mosque in Kruszyniany

Historic sites

Middle Ages
 St. Michael and John the Baptist Church in Łomża (1504–26)

Renaissance
 The ruins of the Royal Castle in Tykocin (15th century)
 The Jewish cemetery in Tykocin (16th century)
 Monastery of the Annunciation in Suprasl (16th–18th centuries)

Baroque
 Dominican Convent of the Visitation of the Blessed Virgin Mary Church in Sejny (1610–19)
 Old Parish Church in Białystok (1617–26)
 Synagogue (1642) and the Talmud house in Tykocin (18th century)
 Trzewiczkowych Carmelite Monastery with the Church of Our Lady of Mount Carmel in Bielsk Podlaski (mid-17th century)
 Branicki Palace in Białystok (17th–18th centuries)
 Summer residence Branicki in Choroszcz (1752–59)
 Holy Trinity Church in Tykocin (1742–50)
 Church of the Assumption of the Virgin Mary in Siemiatycze (1719–27)
 Monastery of the Dominican church of St. And St. John the Baptist. Stephen Martyr in Choroszcz (mid-18th century)
 Capuchin Monastery in Łomża (1770–98)
 Old Town Hall in Bielsk Podlaski (1776–80)
 Sokółki Palace in Pawłowiczch near Sokółka
 Synagogue in Orla
 Bernardine Monastery in Tykocin (1771–91)
 The team Stawiski Franciscan monastery (17th-19th centuries)

Classicism

 Basilica. Birth of the Virgin and St. Nicholas in Bielsk Podlaski (1780)
 Cathedral of St.. Nicholas in Białystok (1843–46)
 Church of Sts. Kolnie Anne (1834–39)
 Co-cathedral of St. Alexander in Suwałki (1825)
 Classical brick mansion in Mały Płock (1835)
 Church of Sts. Anthony in Sokółka (1848)
 Cemetery Cathedral in Łomża
 Synagogue in Kolno (second half of 18th century)

19th century

 Lubomirski Palace in Białystok (second half of 19th century)
 Hasbach Palace in Białystok (late 19th century)
 The palace and park in Buchholtzów Suprasl (1892–1903)
 Team Becker factory in Białystok (19th and early 20th century)
 The fence and gate parafialno-municipal cemetery in Kolno (1809)
 Church in the Parish and (first half of 19th century)
 Catholic Parish in Grabowo (first half of 19th century)
 The Jewish cemetery in Kolno (1817)
 The Jewish cemetery in Stawiski (first half of 19th century)
 Parish Church p.w. St. Adalbert in m (first half of 19th century)
 The team mail Stawiski (2nd quarter of 19th century)
 Neo-Baroque bell tower at the church brick church. St. Anne Kolnie (1862)
 Buildings of the monastery of SS. Benedictine in Łomża (1863)
 Church of the Assumption in Łomża (1877)
 Roman Catholic Cemetery in Poryte (second half of 19th century)
 Church of the Holy Trinity in Zambrów (1879)
 Church of the Holy Trinity in Grajewo (1882)
 Church of Sts. John the Baptist in Wysokie Mazowiecki (1888)
 Building Seminar in Łomża(1866)
 Town Hall in Łomża (1822–23)
 Numerous monuments Street. Dwornej in Łomża
 Manor in Wojnówka
 Basilica of the Assumption in Białystok (1900–05, neo-Gothic)
 The Church of St. Adalbert in Białystok (1906–12)
 The Church of St. Rocha in Białystok (1926–47, modernist)
 Church of the Sacred Heart of Jesus in Augustów (1905–11 eclectic)
 The Church of Our Lady of Częstochowa and St. Casimir in Mońki (1921–35)
 Saints' Church of the Apostles Peter and Paul in Łapy (1918–27)
 Fortress in Osowiec
 Polish Tatar (see "Islam in Poland") wooden mosque and Muslim cemetery in the village of Bohoniki

Government
The voivodeship's seat is the city of Białystok. Like all voivodeships, it has a government-appointed Provincial Governor, as well as an elected Regional Assembly (sejmik) and of the executive elected by that assembly, headed by the voivodeship marshal (marszałek województwa). Administrative powers and competences are statutorily divided between these authorities.

Cities and towns

The voivodeship contains 3 cities and 37 towns. These are listed below in descending order of population (according to official figures for 2019)

See also
Podlasie cuisine

External links
 Topographical maps at scale of 1:50 000

References

 
States and territories established in 1999
1999 establishments in Poland